There have been four baronetcies created for persons with the surname Martin, one in the Baronetage of England, one in the Baronetage of Great Britain and two in the Baronetage of the United Kingdom. All creations are now extinct.

The Martin Baronetcy, of Long Melford in the County of Sussex, was created in the Baronetage of England on 28 March 1667 for Roger Martin. The title became extinct on the death of the fifth Baronet in 1854.

The Martin Baronetcy, of Lockynge in the County of Berkshire, was created in the Baronetage of Great Britain on 28 July 1791 for Henry Martin, Member of Parliament for Southampton. The title became extinct on the death of the fifth Baronet in 1910.

The Martin Baronetcy, of Cappagh in the County of Dublin, was created in the Baronetage of the United Kingdom on 2 June 1885 for the Anglo-Irish Richard Martin, high sheriff of Dublin. The title became extinct on his death in 1901.

The Martin Baronetcy, of Overbury Court in the Parish of Overbury and County of Worcester, was created in the Baronetage of the United Kingdom on 12 December 1905 for the banker and politician Richard Martin. The title became extinct on his death in 1916.

Martin baronets, of Long Melford (1667)
Sir Roger Martin, 1st Baronet (1639–1712)
Sir Roger Martin, 2nd Baronet (1667–1742)
Sir Roger Martin, 3rd Baronet (1689–1762)
Sir Mordaunt Martin, 4th Baronet (1740–1815)
Sir Roger Martin, 5th Baronet (1778–1854)

Martin baronets, of Lockynge (1791)
Sir Henry Martin, 1st Baronet (1733–1794)
Sir Henry William Martin, 2nd Baronet (1768–1842)
Sir Henry Martin, 3rd Baronet (1801–1863)
Sir William Fanshawe Martin, 4th Baronet (1801–1895)
Sir Richard Byam Martin, 5th Baronet (1841–1910)

Martin baronets, of Cappagh (1885)
Sir Richard Martin, 1st Baronet (1831–1901)

Martin baronets, of Overbury Court (1905)
Sir Richard Biddulph Martin, 1st Baronet (1838–1916)

Notes

References
Fox-Davies, Arthur Charles (editor). A Complete Peerage, Baronetage, and Knightage. Edinburgh: Grange Publishing Works, 1905.
Kidd, Charles & Williamson, David (editors). Debrett's Peerage and Baronetage (1990 edition). New York: St Martin's Press, 1990, 

Extinct baronetcies in the Baronetage of England
Extinct baronetcies in the Baronetage of Great Britain
Extinct baronetcies in the Baronetage of the United Kingdom
1667 establishments in England